Harvey Andrew "Harve" Oliphant Jr. (July 7, 1912 – February 20, 1998) was an American football coach.  Oliphant was the head football coach at Adrian College in Adrian, Michigan for four seasons, from 1938 to 1941, compiling a record of 5–26–1. He was also the head basketball coach at Adrian from 1938 to 1942, tallying a mark of 15–51.

Oliphant was inducted into the Western New Mexico University Hall of Fame in 1994.

Head coaching record

Football

References

1912 births
1998 deaths
Adrian Bulldogs football coaches
Adrian Bulldogs men's basketball coaches